Timothée is a French masculine given name. It is the French variant of the ancient Greek given name Τιμόθεος (Timotheos) meaning "one who honours God", from τιμή  "honour" and θεός "god". The Latin equivalent is Timotheus. Its English equivalent is Timothy.

People
Timothée or Timothé may refer to:

Given name
 Timothee Adamowski (1858–1943), Polish-born American conductor, composer, and violinist
 Timothée Adolphe (born 1989), French Paralympic athlete
 Timothée Atouba (born 1982), Cameroonian footballer
 Timothee Besset, French programmer
 Timothée Brodeur (1804–1860), notary and political figure in Canada East
 Timothée Chaillou, French art critic
 Timothée Chalamet (born 1995), American actor
 Timothé Cognat (born 1998), French footballer
 Timothée Dieng (born 1992), French footballer
 Timothée de Fombelle (born 1973), French author and playwright
 Timothée Franchère ( 1790–1849), Canadien businessman and political figure
 Timothée Guillimin (born 1996), French rugby union player
 Timothee Heijbrock (born 1985), Dutch rower
 Timothée Jordan, French cricketer
 Timothée Kolodziejczak (born 1991), French footballer
 Timothé Luwawu-Cabarrot (born 1995), French basketball player
 Timothée Malendoma (1935–2010), Central African politician
 Timothée Modibo-Nzockena (1950–2016), Roman Catholic bishop
 Timothé Nadim (born 1997), French politician and musician
 Timothé Nkada (born 1999), French footballer
 Timothée Pembélé (born 2002), French footballer
 Timothée Picard (born 1975), French academic and music critic
 Timothée Puel (1813–1890), French physician and botanist
 Timothé Rupil (born 2003), Luxembourgian footballer
 Timothée Taufflieb (born 1992), French footballer
 Timothee Yap Jin Wei (born 1994), Singaporean sprinter

Surname
 Didier Thimothée (born 1970), French footballer
 John Timothee (1870–1901), Australian rules footballer
 Louis Timothee ((1699–1738), printer and publisher in colonial America

See also

Timothy (given name)
Tim (given name)
Timmy
Timo
Timotheus

References

French masculine given names